Larga vida al Rock and Roll (English: Long Live Rock and Roll) is the debut album by the Spanish heavy metal band Barón Rojo. It was released on April 27, 1981. The album is dedicated to the memory of John Lennon, who was murdered the previous year.

Track listing

Personnel

Barón Rojo
Armando de Castro - lead, rhythm and slide guitars, backing vocals, lead vocals on track 2
Carlos de Castro - lead, rhythm and slide guitars, backing vocals, lead vocals on tracks 4, 6 and 8
José Luis Campuzano - bass, backing vocals, lead vocals on tracks 1, 3, 7 and 9
Hermes Calabria - drums, percussion

Production
Vicente Romero aka Chapa - producer
Tino Azores - engineer

Certifications

References

1981 debut albums
Barón Rojo albums
Spanish-language albums